The Scout and Guide movement in Costa Rica is served by
 Asociación de Guías y Scouts de Costa Rica, member of the World Association of Girl Guides and Girl Scouts and of the World Organization of the Scout Movement
 Scouts Independientes de Costa Rica, prospect member of the World Federation of Independent Scouts

International Scouting units in Costa Rica
In addition, there are American Boy Scouts in San José, linked to the Direct Service branch of the Boy Scouts of America, which supports units around the world.

See also